Leccinum brunneo-olivaceum is a species of bolete fungus in the family Boletaceae. It was described as new to science in 1951 by Wally Snell, Ester Dick, and Lexemuel Ray Hesler. The type collection was made in Great Smoky Mountains National Park in Tennessee.

See also
List of Leccinum species
List of North American boletes

References

Fungi described in 1951
Fungi of North America
brunneo-olivaceum